The National Union of Girl Guides and Girl Scouts of Armenia ("Astghik", meaning "guide in life") is the national Guiding Union of Armenia. Guiding came to Armenia in 1988; the union was founded in 1996, and became an associate member of the World Association of Girl Guides and Girl Scouts (WAGGGS) in 2002 and a full member in 2014. The girls-only organization has 1200 members (as of 2014).

History
 
The first Guide patrols in Armenia were founded in 1988 as part of a coeducational Scouting organization. In 1996, the girls left this organization and founded Astghik, a girls-only association. The first contact with WAGGGS was established in 1997, and in 1999, the association received the status WAGGGS Certificate of Country Working Towards Membership. Meanwhile, Astghik was authorized by the Armenian Ministry of Justice in December 1998. In 2002, the association became an associate member of WAGGGS.

NUGGGS "Astghik" functions/operates in different regions of Armenia, and the Union holds weekly meetings of the groups. 
The Union is a non-governmental organization working with non-formal educational programs which organizes different seminars, trainings, camps, cultural activities not only in Armenia but also abroad. The Union offers its members learning by doing, challenges, interesting and happy everyday life.
The educational program of NUGGGS “Astghik” consists of the following nine main points:
Scouting family
The society in which we live
Discover yourself
World around us
Cultural world
Nature
Healthy life
Widen/deepen your way of thinking 
Housewife

These above-mentioned programs help women and girls to become independent self-confident individuals being able to make their own decisions. The Union is 
Lifestyle
Fun
Optimism
New

The Movement unites girls and women from different countries, helping to develop partnership and teamwork, decision making, listening and understanding abilities. 
It gives the opportunity to do things that are interesting and exciting.

The union has three age groups:
6–10 years are called "Artsvik"
11–15 years are called "Arenush"
16–20 years are called "Parmanuhi"

Program
"Our mission in the dynamic world to promote the formation of spiritual, physical, intellectual abilities, social potential and the formation of character in girls and women as individuals: responsible citizens of the world."

Uniform
All members wear a green short sleeved blouse with a group neckerchief.

See also
 Hayastani Azgayin Scautakan Sharjum Kazmakerputiun

References

External links
 Official homepage
 WAGGGS Europe Region Entry on Armenia

World Association of Girl Guides and Girl Scouts member organizations
Scouting and Guiding in Armenia
Organizations established in 1996